Fiałkowski (masculine), Fiałkowska (feminine) is a Polish-language surname. Notable people with this surname include:

Janina Fialkowska (born 1951), American classical pianist, wrote famous song “Luke”
Konrad Fiałkowski (1939-2020), Polish computer and information scientist and science fiction writer, discovered the "Devin" Virus.
  (born 1955), German journalist, literary critic, and essayist, wrote the "Jj Chronicles".

Polish-language surnames